Helen Catherine "Kate" Lonergan (born 4 January 1962 in Barton-upon-Irwell, Lancashire) is an English former actress, best known for playing the role of Maid Marian in the 1989–94 BBC1 children's television series Maid Marian and her Merry Men.

Prior to being cast as Marian, Lonergan had appeared in the screenplay Testimony of a Child and The Tall Guy. She has since appeared in numerous episodes of TV series, including the mini-series Terry and Julian (1992) and Four Fathers (1999), as well as The Bill, Hetty Wainthropp Investigates, The Hello Girls, Born and Bred, Doctors, Is It Legal?, and Blue Heaven.

Having moved on from acting and after 10 years of designing, planting and maintaining gardens across London, Lonergan co-founded The Blackheath Windowbox Company, a "bespoke containerised gardening company", in March 2011  which was dissolved in 2016.

References

External links

1962 births
Living people
English film actresses
English television actresses
People from Lancashire